The Lake Wales Ridge State Forest is in the U.S. state of Florida. The  forest is located on the Lake Wales Ridge in Central Florida, within Polk County near Frostproof.

The state forest consists of two large tracts, separated by 2 miles.  The Walk in Water Tract, adjoining Lake Weohyakapka (Lake Walk in Water), contains the largest contiguous area of ridge sandhill in public ownership.  The Arbuckle Tract, adjoining Lake Arbuckle to the south, is a good example of an ancient scrub ecosystem.  Both tracts are open to the public and include hiking trails.
Both tracts provide protected habitat for plants species endemic to Florida scrub.

References

External links

 Lake Wales Ridge State Forest: Florida Division of Forestry- FDACS includes a map of the forest's boundaries.

Florida state forests
Protected areas of Polk County, Florida